India competed at the 2008 Summer Olympics in Beijing, People's Republic of China. India was represented by the Indian Olympic Association (IOA). A contingent of 57 athletes in 12 sports represented India, and had a support-staff of 42 officials.

For the first time since 1928, the men's national field hockey team was unable to take part in the Summer Olympics due to its failure to qualify.  A two-year ban imposed by the International Weightlifting Federation after the 2006 Commonwealth Games doping scandal originally resulted in only one Olympic weightlifter, Monika Devi from India being scheduled to compete, but she withdrew from the competition after failing the drug test. On 9 August 2008, IWF declared that she was clean, but the event she was supposed to participate in, had already closed.

On 11 August 2008, Abhinav Bindra won the gold medal in the men's 10 m air rifle. It was a huge achievement for India at the Olympic games shooting event. In doing so, he won the first ever individual gold medal for India, and the first medal in any event for India at the Beijing Games. The previous highest individual achievements for India were two silver medals won by Norman Pritchard, an Englishman born in India, at the 1900 Paris Olympics and one silver medal won by the 2008 flagbearer Rajyavardhan Rathore at the 2004 Athens Olympics. Sushil Kumar won the second ever wrestling medal for India, the first being the bronze earned by Khashaba Dadasaheb Jadhav in the 1952 Helsinki Olympics. Vijender Singh won a bronze medal in the middleweight boxing category, having lost in the semifinals. This was India's first-ever Olympic medal in boxing.

The 2008 Beijing Olympics saw the best ever performance by an Indian contingent, in terms of the number of medals (this record was later surpassed in 2012). They won three medals in all (one gold and two bronze medals), surpassing the two silvers by Norman Pritchard in 1900 Paris Olympics and the gold and bronze medals won by the Indian field hockey team and Khashaba Dadasaheb Jadhav respectively, at the 1952 Helsinki Olympics.

Medalists

Competitors

Archery

Athletics

Men
Track & road events

Field events

Women
Track & road events

Field events

Combined events – Heptathlon

* The athlete who finished in second place, Lyudmila Blonska of the Ukraine, tested positive for a banned substance. Both the A and the B tests were positive, therefore Blonska was stripped of her silver medal, and all Indian heptathletes moved up a position.

Badminton

Boxing

Judo

Rowing

Men

Qualification Legend: FA=Final A (medal); FB=Final B (non-medal); FC=Final C (non-medal); FD=Final D (non-medal); FE=Final E (non-medal); FF=Final F (non-medal); SA/B=Semifinals A/B; SC/D=Semifinals C/D; SE/F=Semifinals E/F; QF=Quarterfinals; R=Repechage

Sailing

Open

M = Medal race; EL = Eliminated – did not advance into the medal race; CAN = Race cancelled;

Shooting

Men

Women

Swimming

Men

Table tennis

Tennis

Wrestling

Men's freestyle

See also
 India at the Olympics
 Sports of India

References

External links
 Indian contingent to the 2008 Beijing Olympics (PDF) 

Nations at the 2008 Summer Olympics
2008
Summer Olympics